The historicity of Muhammad refers to the study of Muhammad as a historical figure and critical examination of sources upon which traditional accounts are based. 

The earliest Muslim source of information for the life of Muhammad, the Quran, gives very little personal information and its historicity is debated. Prophetic biography, known as sīra, along with attributed records of the words, actions, and the silent approval of Muhammad, known as hadith, survive in the historical works of writers from the second and third centuries of the Muslim era (c. 700−1000 CE), and give a great deal of information on Muhammad, but the  reliability of this information is very much debated in some academic circles. In addition there are a relatively small number of contemporaneous or near-contemporaneous non-Muslim sources which attest to the existence of Muhammad and are valuable both in themselves and for comparison with Muslim sources.

Islamic sources

The main Islamic source on Muhammad's life are the Quran and accounts of Muhammad's life based on oral traditions known as sīra and hadith.

Quran

According to traditional Islamic scholarship, all of the Quran was written down by Muhammad's companions while he was alive (during CE 610–632), but it was primarily an orally related document.  
Following the death of Muhammad the Quran ceased to be revealed, and companions who had memorized the Quran began to die off (particularly after the Battle of Yamama in 633). Worried that parts of the Quran might be irretrievably lost,  senior companion Umar urged Caliph Abu Bakr to order the collection of the pieces of the Quran which had hitherto been scattered among "palm-leaf stalks, thin white stones, ... [and] men who knew it by heart, ..." put them together. 
Under Caliph Uthman, a committee of five copied the scraps into a single volume, "monitoring the text as they went", resolving disagreements about verses, tracking down a lost verse. This muṣḥaf – that became known as the "Uthmanic codex" – was finished around 650 CE, whereupon Uthman issued an order for all other existing personal and individual copies and dialects of the Quran  (known as Ahruf) to be burnt.

Modern scholars differ in their assessment of the Quran as a historical source about Muhammad's life.

According to the Encyclopedia of Islam, the "Qur'an responds constantly and often candidly to Muhammad's changing historical circumstances and contains a wealth of hidden data that are relevant to the task of the quest for the historical Muhammad." In contrast, Solomon A. Nigosian writes that the Quran tells us very little about the life of Muhammad.  Unlike the Bible's narratives of the life of Moses or Jesus, Michael Cook notes that
while the Koran tells many stories after its fashion, that of Muhammad is not among them. There are references to events in his life, but they are only references, not narratives. In addition, the book is not given to mentioning names in the context of its own time. Muhammad himself is named four times, and a couple of his contemporaries once each ... and for this reason it is almost impossible to relate the scripture to his life without going outside it. 

(As to the historicity of the Quran itself, some scholars also disagree. Some argue "the Quran is convincingly the words of Muhammad" (F.E. Peters), with the parchment of an early copy of Quran – the Birmingham manuscript, whose text differs only slightly to modern versions – being dated to roughly around the lifetime of Muhammad.  Some Western scholars, however, question the accuracy of some of the Quran's historical accounts and whether the holy book existed in any form before the last decade of the seventh century" (Patricia Crone and Michael Cook); and/or argue it is a "cocktail of texts", some of which may have been existent a hundred years before Muhammad, that evolved (Gerd R. Puin),  or was redacted (J. Wansbrough), to form the Quran.)

Traditions
Unlike the Quran, the hadith and sīra are devoted to Muhammad, his life, his words, deeds, approval, and example to Muslims in general.

Prophetic biography (sīra)

Much is believed to be known about Muhammad from Sira literature:
The life of Muhammad is known as the Sira and was lived in the full light of history. Everything he did and said was recorded. Because he could not read and write himself, he was constantly served by a group of 45 scribes who wrote down his sayings, instructions, and his activities. Muhammad himself insisted on documenting his important decisions. Nearly three hundred of his documents have come down to us, including political treaties, military enlistments, assignments of officials, and state correspondence written on tanned leather. We thus know his life to the minutest details: how he spoke, sat, slept (sic), dressed, walked; his behavior as a husband, father, nephew; his attitudes toward women, children, animals; his business transactions and stance toward the poor and the oppressed ...

In the sīra literature, the most important extant biography are the two recensions of Ibn Ishaq's (d. 768), now known as Sīrat Rasūl Allah ("Biography/Life of the Messenger/Apostle of Allah"), which survive in the works of his editors, most notably Ibn Hisham (d. 834) and Yunus b. Bukayr (d.814–815), although not in its original form. According to Ibn Hisham, Ibn Ishaq wrote his biography some 120 to 130 years after Muhammad's death. Many, but not all, scholars accept the accuracy of these biographies, though their accuracy is unascertainable.

After Ibn Ishaq, there are a number of shorter accounts (some of which are earlier than Ibn Ishaq) recorded in different forms (see List of earliest writers of sīra). Other biographies of Muhammad include al-Waqidi's (d. 822) and then Ibn Sa'd's (d.844–45). Al-Waqidi is often criticized by early Muslim historians who state that the author is unreliable. These are not "biographies" in the modern sense of the word, but rather accounts of Muhammad's military expeditions, his sayings,  the reasons for and interpretations of verses in the Quran.

Secular historians have been much more critical of Sira.

Tom Holland notes that Ibn Hisham credits angels with helping Muslims to victory at the Battle of Badr, and wonders why he should be considered a reliable historical source any more than Homer (who portrayed gods as influencing battles in his epic poem the Iliad).

According to Wim Raven, it is often noted that a coherent image of Muhammad cannot be formed from the literature of sīra, whose authenticity and factual value have been questioned on a number of different grounds. He lists the following arguments against the authenticity of sīra, followed here by counter-arguments:

 Hardly any sīra work was compiled during the first century of Islam. Fred Donner points out that the earliest historical writings about the origins of Islam first emerged in 60-70 AH, well within the first century of Hijra (see also List of biographies of Muhammad). Furthermore, the sources now extant, dating from the second, third, and fourth centuries AH, are according to Donner mostly compilations of material derived from earlier sources.
 The many discrepancies exhibited in different narrations found in sīra works. Yet, despite the lack of a single orthodoxy in Islam, there is still a marked agreement on the most general features of the traditional origins story.
 Later sources claiming to know more about the time of Muhammad than earlier ones (to add embellishments and exaggeration common to an oral storytelling tradition).
 Discrepancies compared to non-Muslim sources. But there are also similarities and agreements both in information specific to Muhammad, and concerning Muslim tradition at large.
 Some parts or genres of sīra, namely those dealing with miracles, are not fit as sources for scientific historiographical information about Muhammad, except for showing the beliefs and doctrines of his community.

Nevertheless, other content of sīra, like the Constitution of Medina, are generally considered to be authentic by both Muslim and non-Muslim historians.

Henri Lammens complains of contradictions in the Traditions about Muhammad's life, including on the number of his children and wives. Some accounts have him having one child, others two, and still another claimed he had twelve children, including eight boys. While most accounts state he had nine wives, "some passages of the sira speak of twenty three wives." Muhammad is thought to have lived between 60 and 65 years according to tradition.

Hadith

The hadith collections include traditional, hagiographic accounts of verbal and physical traditions attributed to Muhammad, and for many, often explain what a verse in the Quran is referring to in regards to Muhammad. Unlike the Quran, hadiths are not universally accepted by Muslims.

Early Muslim scholars were concerned that some hadiths (and sīra reports) were fabricated, and thus they developed a science of hadith criticism (see Hadith studies) to distinguish between genuine sayings and those that were forged, recorded using different words, or were wrongly ascribed to Muhammad.

In general, the majority of western academics view the hadith collections with considerable caution. Bernard Lewis states that "The collection and recording of Hadith did not take place until several generations after the death of the Prophet. During that period the opportunities and motives for falsification were almost unlimited."

The main feature of hadith is that of Isnad (chains of transmission), which are the basis of determining the authenticity of the reports in traditional Islamic scholarship. According to Stephen Humphreys, while a number of "very capable" modern scholars defended the general authenticity of isnads, most modern scholars regard isnads with "deep suspicion".

Jonathan A. C. Brown, a Sunni who follows the Hanbali school of Islamic jurisprudence, asserts that the hadith tradition is a "common sense science" or a "common sense tradition" and is "one of the biggest accomplishments in human intellectual history ... in its breadth, in its depth, in its complexity and in its internal consistency."

Non-Muslim sources

Early Islamic history is also reflected in sources written in Greek, Syriac, Armenian, and Hebrew by Jewish and Christian communities, all of which are dated after 633 CE. These sources contain some essential differences with regard to Muslim sources, in particular regarding the chronology and Muhammad's attitude towards the Jews and Palestine. According to Neva and Koren, no Byzantine or Syriac sources provide any detail on "Muhammad's early career ... which predate the Muslim literature on the subject".

According to Syriac and Byzantine sources studied by historian S.P. Brock, "The title 'prophet'" applied to Muhammad "is not very common, 'apostle' even less so. Normally he is simply described as the first of the Arab kings, and it would be generally true to say that the Syriac sources of this period see the conquests primarily as Arab, and not Muslim".

There is a reference recording the Arab conquest of Syria (known as Fragment on the Arab Conquests), that mentions Muhammed. This much faded note is preserved on folio 1 of BL Add. 14,461, a codex containing the Gospel according to Matthew and the Gospel according to Mark. This note appears to have been penned soon after the battle of Gabitha (636 CE) at which the Arabs inflicted crushing defeat of the Byzantines. Wright was first to draw the attention to the fragment and suggested that "it seems to be a nearly contemporary notice", a view which was also endorsed by Nöldeke. The purpose of jotting this note in the book of Gospels appears to be commemorative as the author appears to have realized how momentous the events of his time were. The words "we saw" are positive evidence that the author was a contemporary. The author also talks about olive oil, cattle, ruined villages, suggesting that he belonged to peasant stock, i.e., parish priest or a monk who could read and write. It is worthwhile cautioning that the condition of the text is fragmentary and many of the readings unclear or disputable. The lacunae (gaps in the text) are supplied in square brackets:

The 7th-century Chronicle of 640 was published by Wright who first brought to attention the mention of an early date of 947 AG (635–36 CE). The contents of this manuscript has puzzled many scholars for their apparent lack of coherence as it contains an assembly of texts with diverse nature. In relation to Arabs of Mohamed, there are two important dates mentioned in this manuscript.

It is the first date above which is of great importance as it provides the first explicit reference to Muhammad in a non-Muslim source. The account is usually identified with the battle of Dathin. According to Hoyland, "its precise dating inspires confidence that it ultimately derives from first-hand knowledge".

Another account of the early seventh century comes from Sebeos who was an Armenian bishop of the House of Bagratuni. His account indicates he was writing  at a time when memories of sudden eruption of the Arabs were fresh. He knows Muhammad's name, that he was a merchant by profession, and hints that his life was suddenly changed by a divinely inspired revelation. Sebeos is the first non-Muslim author to present a theory for the rise of Islam that pays attention to what the Muslims themselves thought they were doing.

From this chronicle, there are indications that he lived through many of the events he relates. He maintains that the account of Arab conquests derives from the fugitives who had been eyewitnesses thereof. He concludes with Mu'awiya's ascendancy in the Arab civil war (656–661 CE), which suggests that he was writing soon after this date.

Modern scholarship

Though the Quran contains few and rudimentary details of the prophet's life, most of the biographical information about Muhammad comes from the sirah (biographical literature), especially the work of Ibn Ishaq. These sources normally provide a historical trail of names that lead, in some cases, to an eyewitness and sometimes converge with other earlier sources near the time of the prophet. Though "there is no compelling reason to suggest that the basic scaffolding of the traditional Islamic account of Muhammad's life is unhistorical", a much more detailed biography is difficult to be understood as historically certain knowledge. According to Wim Raven, attempts to distinguish between the historical elements and the unhistorical elements of many of the reports of Muhammad have been problematic. According to F. E. Peters, despite any difficulties with the biographical sources, scholars generally see valuable historical information about Muhammad therein and suggest that what is needed are methods to be able to sort out the likely from the unlikely.    
  
In the 1970s the Revisionist School of Islamic Studies raised fundamental doubts about the reliability of traditional Islamic sources and applied the historical-critical methods to the early Islamic period, including the veracity of the conventional account of Muhammad.  A major source of difficulty in the quest for the historical Muhammad is the modern lack of knowledge about pre-Islamic Arabia. According to Harald Motzki, "On the one hand, it is not possible to write a historical biography of the Prophet without being accused of using the sources uncritically, while on the other hand, when using the sources critically, it is simply not possible to write such a biography." 

In 1952 French Arabist Régis Blachère, author of a critical biography of Muhammad that took "fully into account the skeptical conclusions" of Ignác Goldziher and Henri Lammens, i.e that Islamic hadith had been corrupted and could not be considered reliable sources of information, wrote We no longer have any sources that would allow us to write a detailed history of Muhammad with a rigorous and continuous chronology. To resign oneself to a partial or total ignorance is necessary, above all for everything that concerns the period prior to Muhammad's divine call [ca. 610 CE]. All a truly scientific biography can achieve is to lay out the successive problems engendered by this preapostolate period, sketch out the general background atmosphere in which Muhammad received his divine call, give in broad brush strokes the development of his apostleship at Mecca, try with a greater chance of success to put in order the known facts, and finally put back into the penumbra all that remains uncertain. To want to go further is to fall into hagiography or romanticization.

Historian John Burton states In judging the content, the only resort of the scholar is to the yardstick of probability, and on this basis, it must be repeated, virtually nothing of use to the historian emerges from the sparse record of the early life of the founder of the latest of the great world religions ... so, however far back in the Muslim tradition one now attempts to reach, one simply cannot recover a scrap of information of real use in constructing the human history of Muhammad, beyond the bare fact that he once existed.

Michael Cook laments that comparing Ibn Ishaq with the later commentator Al-Waqid — who based his writing on Ibn Ishaq but added much colorful but made-up detail — reveals how oral history can be contaminated by the fiction of storytellers (qussa).  "We have seen what half a century of story-telling could achieve between Ibn Ishaq and al-Waqidi, at a time when we know that much material had already been committed to writing. What the same processes may have brought about in the century before Ibn Ishaq is something we can only guess at."

Overall, Cook takes the view that evidence independent of Islamic tradition "precludes any doubts as to whether Muhammad was a real person" and clearly shows that he became the central figure of a new religion in the decades following his death. He reports, though, that this evidence conflicts with the Islamic view in some aspects, associating Muhammad with Israel rather than Inner Arabia, complicating the question of his sole authorship or transmission of the Quran, and suggesting that there were Jews as well as Arabs among his followers.

Cook's fellow revisionist Patricia Crone complains that Sīrat is written "not by a grandchild, but a great grandchild of the Prophet's generation", that it is written from the point of view of the ulama and Abbasid, so that "we shall never know ... how the Umayyad caliphs remembered their prophet".

While Crone argues that Muhammad was a person whose existence is supported by various sources, she takes a view that Muhammad's traditional association with the Arabian Peninsula may be "doctrinally inspired", and is put in doubt by the Quran itself, which describes agricultural activity that could not have taken place there, as well as making a reference to the site of Sodom which appears to place Muhammad's community close to the Dead Sea.

Concerning the dates of Muhammad's life, Lawrence Conrad writes that "well into the second century A.H. [Islamic] scholarly opinion on the birth date of the Prophet displayed a range of variance of 85 years. On the assumption that chronology is crucial to the stabilization of any tradition of historical narrative, whether transmitted orally or in writing, one can see in this state of affairs a clear indication that sīra studies in the second century were still in a state of flux".  Since second century A.H. scholarly opinion is the earliest scholarly opinion, and assuming the closer scholars were to the actual event the more likely their sources are to be accurate, this suggests a surprising lack of information among Islamic scholars about basic information on Muhammad.

Robert Hoyland suggests his historical importance may have been exaggerated by his followers, writing that "other" Arab leaders "in other locations" had preceded Muhammad in attacking the weakened Byzantine and Persian empires, but these had been "airbrushed out of history by later Muslim writers". Hoyland and other historians argue that the original Arab invaders were not all Muslims.

Minority views 
A minority of historians have posited that Muhammad may be mythical. In the 2003 book Crossroads to Islam, Yehuda D. Nevo and Judith Koren advanced a thesis, based on an extensive examination of archaeological evidence from Negev desert from the early Islamic period, that Muhammad may never have existed, with monotheistic Islam only coming into existence some time after he is supposed to have lived. This has been described as "plausible or at least arguable" by David Cook of Rice University, but also compared to Holocaust denial by historian Colin Wells, who suggests that the authors deal with some of the evidence illogically. 

In 2007, Karl-Heinz Ohlig suggested that the person of Muhammed was not central to early Islam at all, and that at this very early stage Islam was in fact an Arabic Christian sect which had objections to the concept of the trinity, and that the later hadith and biographies are in large part legends, instrumental in severing Islam from its Christian roots and building a full-blown new religion. In 2008, Sven Kalisch, a former Muslim convert and Germany's first professor of Islamic theology, also questioned whether the prophet Muhammad existed. In 2011, Hans Jansen, a Dutch scholar, expressed similar views.

See also
 Ashtiname of Muhammad
 Reliability of the Quran
 Historicity of Jesus
 Historicity of the Bible
 Historiography of early Islam
 Islam: The Untold Story
 Muhammad's letters to the heads of state
 Phantom time hypothesis
 Relics of Muhammad
 Soviet Orientalist studies in Islam
 Seeing Islam as Others Saw It

Notes

Citations

References
 
 
 

 

 

 
 
 

 

Muhammad
Muhammad